Sayed Amjad Hussain (Urdu:سيد امجد حسين) is a 85 year old Pakistani-American cardiothoracic surgeon, and writer. He has invented two surgical devices – the pleuroperitoneal shunt and a special endotracheal tube, Dr. S. Amjad Hussain has to his credit 50 research papers on medical literature, 20 scholarly presentations to academic institutions, over 60 lectures and presentations to civic, service and other subjects and over four hundred articles on a variety of subjects published in various newspapers and magazines. He was a member of Team Indus which covered the entire 2,000 miles of the river Indus in Pakistan from its source in Western Tibet. This trip was claimed to have been the third expedition in history to reach that site. The achievements of the Team Indus were entered into Congressional Records of the U.S. Congress in June 1997. While on a humanitarian mission, he donated tons of supplies and equipment to the Dominican Republic, China and Pakistan. Also, his photographs have appeared on 35 magazine covers and in 8 calendars. The Herald Magazine August 2003, introduced Dr. Amjad Hussain as the jack-of-all-trades and master of many.

Currently, he is an emeritus professor of thoracic and cardiovascular surgery in the College of Medicine and Life Sciences and emeritus professor of humanities in the College of Literature, Languages and Social Sciences at the University of Toledo.

Early life and education 

Hussain was born on January 1, 1937, in Peshawar to Agha Sayed Gulbacha. He received his early education from Government High School No. 1, Peshawar, and Islamia College Peshawar. He graduated with distinction from Khyber Medical College Peshawar in 1962. He received general surgery training at the Medical University of Ohio and thoracic and cardiovascular surgery training at Wayne State University in Detroit, Michigan. He was given a fellowship from the Royal College of Surgeons of Canada in 1973 and made a diplomate of the American Board of Thoracic Surgery in 1970. Dr. Hussain was married to the late Dottie Brown Hussain and has three children: Natasha Raabia Hussain, S. Waqaar (Qarie Marshall) Hussain and S. Osman (Monie) Hussain.

Professional career 

Hussain returned to Pakistan in 1970 and taught at his alma mater (Khyber Medical College Peshawar) for four years. He came back to the United States in 1975 and began a private practice of cardiothoracic vascular surgery in Toledo. He worked as chief of thoracic and cardiovascular surgery, Lock Haven Hospital, Lock Haven; as chief of the Section of Thoracic and Cardiovascular Surgery, Mercy St. Charles Hospital in Oregon, and now works as the professor emeritus of the Medical University of Ohio, Toledo (now the University of Toledo). He has been visiting professor to Khyber Medical College, Peshawar; University of Garyounus, Benghazi, Libya; Government Medical College, Amritsar, India; University of Alberta, Canada, and University of Beijing, China. in 2020 he was awarded an honorary Doctor of Science (SciD) Degree by the University of Toledo.

Contributions 

Hussain is a multifaceted man, and his contributions as a surgeon, researcher, explorer and photographer have been exemplary. He has authored 50 scientific papers in national and international medical journals. He is an author who has written fourteen books on as diverse a subjects as religion, culture, history and international relations. He has described a number of new surgical techniques and has invented two medical devices: the pleura-peritoneal shunt and a special endotracheal tube to supply oxygen during fiberoptic broncchoscopy in awake patients. He has written over four hundred newspaper and magazine articles about history, politics, religion and culture in American and international publications like The Blade, Toledo Magazine, Explorers Journal, Weekly Pakistan Link, The Herald Magazine and various Pakistani News Papers. He is also an op-ed columnist for The Toledo Blade.
At the community level, Hussain has helped build the Islamic Center of Greater Toledo, one of the largest Islamic Centers in North America. While on humanitarian mission, he donated tons of supplies and equipment to the Dominican Republic, China and Pakistan. He endowed a visiting professorship for Khyber Medical College at The University of Toledo College of Medicine. In 2020 he was invited to address the commencement ceremony of the University of Toledo, College of Medicine and Life Sciences.

Achievements 

Dr. Hussain is a member of 17 professional organizations 16 hospitals, 10 administrative positions, various committees,, is a visiting professor to 12 universities throughout the world and is a member of the editorial board of 6 medical journals. He gave 122 presentations at regional, national and international meetings, delivered 147 lectures in different colleges and universities of medicine around the world and appeared in 47 Television Talk shows, interviews and documentaries.

As an internationally recognized explorer, he founded the Team Indus exploration group which traversed and photographed the entire 2,000 miles of the river Indus in Pakistan during the first three expeditions (in 1987, 1992 and 1994) and the source of the river in western Tibet during the 1996 expedition. This expedition was chronicled as cover story in the fall 1997 issue of the Explorers Journal. He took part in a number of photography exhibitions and won 26 prizes. His photographs have appeared on 35 magazine covers and in 8 calendars. 16 of his medical photographs has been published in the Photo Clinic section of "Consultant Magazine". His photographs have also been published in text books.

In 1982, Dr. Hussain was appointed by the Government of Pakistan to serve on its Health Policy Panel to formulate the country's Five-Year Health Plan. After his retirement in 2004, he was elevated to the rank of Professor Emeritus by the University of Toledo. In recognition of his many achievements, The University of Toledo established the S. Amjad Hussain Endowed Professorship in Thoracic and Cardiovascular Surgery in 2009.

Affiliations with organizations 

Mr. Hussain has been a member of 19 civic and religious organizations and 17 professional organizations and has held more than 20 leadership positions in other organizations of which some are listed below:

 Member, Adventure Foundation of Pakistan, 1987–present
 Foreign Fellow of Pakistan Academy of Sciences, 2021–present
 Fellow, Explorers Club (USA),1989–present
 President Islamic Center of Greater Toledo, 1985–1986 &1995–1998
 Chairman, board of directors WGTE Public Broadcasting, Toledo, OH 2010–present
 Member, board of directors 1991–2002 Pakistan American Congress
 Founding President 1988–1993 Friends of Pakistan, Toledo, OH
 Editor, Toledo Medicine 1996–present
 Editorial Board, Pakistan Journal of Cardiovascular and Thoracic Surgery 1999–present
 President, Association of Pakistani Physicians of North America 1982–1983
 President, Toledo Surgical Society, Toledo, OH 1990–1991
 Fellow, American College of Surgeons 1972–present
 Member of International Society for Cardiovascular Surgery 1990–present
 Member of International Surgical Society 1991–2002

Awards and honours 

For his many activities and accomplishments, Hussain has been
recognized by his alma mater, Khyber Medical College, Peshawar; the House and
Senate of the State of Ohio, the Medical College of Ohio, the Toledo Surgical Society,
the Association of Pakistani Physicians of North America and many other organizations.

Following is the list of award and honours:

 Roots of Diversity Art Exhibition Arts Commission of Greater Toledo "Midday Lunch in the Fields" First Prize 1993
 The Best Book of 1996–1997 Award and the Abasin Gold Medal for Yuk Shehre Arzoo – 1998
 Selection of his radio play Doctor as one of the seven best plays of the year Radio Pakistan, Peshawar, September 24, 1960
 Lifetime Achievement Award of Khyber Medical College Alumni Association of North America 1992.
 Induction in the Medical Mission Hall of Fame. April 2012
 Lifetime Achievement Award of Khyber Medical College, Peshawar, Pakistan for "Many contributions to his alma mater, his services to Peshawar and Pakistan, November 2005
 Bestowed the title "Baba-e-Peshawar" (Father of Peshawar) by the Governor of Khyber Pakhtunkhwa (NWFP) on behalf of the citizens of Peshawar, Pakistan. December 14, 1998.
 Honored by Khyber Medical College with the title "Farzand-e-Khyber"(The Son of Khyber) December 1993
 Distinguished Service and Excellence Award of the Association of International Physicians for "superb professional achievements", 1986
 Awarded Key to the Golden Door and inducted into the Heritage Hall of Fame of the International Institute for "superb professional achievements", 1986

See also 

 University of Toledo College of Medicine
 List of Pakistani inventions and discoveries

References

External links 
The Medical Mission Hall of Fame Foundation

Khyber Medical College alumni
1937 births
People from Peshawar
Pakistani inventors
Pakistani emigrants to the United States
Pakistani medical writers
Pakistani cardiologists
Living people
American people of Pashtun descent
American physicians of Pakistani descent
People from Maumee, Ohio